The Gothia Towers, in Gothenburg, Sweden, is the largest hotel in the Nordic countries. Part of the Swedish Exhibition and Congress Centre, it has 1,200 rooms and eleven suites and offers a variety of restaurants and bars.

Construction
The first tower was built in 1984, and the second in 2001. The third tower was built between 2011 and 2014. The third tower is the tallest building in Gothenburg and the sixth tallest building in Sweden.

Facilities
In 2014, the Upper House was inaugurated in the second tower, a five-star hotel within the hotel. The Upper House has an awarded restaurant and an exclusive 3-floor spa with an outdoor glass bottom pool on the 19th floor. Also inaugurated in 2014, was the show arena the Theatre.

Heaven 23 
Heaven 23 is a bar and restaurant located on the 23rd floor. It was opened in connection with the second tower. The restaurant and bar have a total of 178 restaurant and bar seats.

References

External links

 

Buildings and structures in Gothenburg
Hotels in Sweden
1984 establishments in Sweden
Hotels established in 1984
Hotel buildings completed in 1984
Hotel buildings completed in 2001
Hotel buildings completed in 2014
Skyscrapers in Sweden
Skyscraper hotels